Bergen op Zoom is a railway station located in Bergen op Zoom, Netherlands. The station was opened on 23 December 1863 and is located on the Roosendaal–Vlissingen railway. The services are operated by Nederlandse Spoorwegen.

Train service
The following services currently call at Bergen op Zoom:
2x per hour intercity service Amsterdam - Haarlem - Leiden - The Hague - Rotterdam - Dordrecht - Roosendaal - Vlissingen (local service between Roosendaal and Vlissingen)
2x per weekday intercity service Roosendaal - Vlissingen (express service between Roosendaal and Vlissingen in the peak direction, only stopping at Middelburg, Goes and Bergen op Zoom. Splits from/Combines with the regular Amsterdam - Vlissingen intercity service at Roosendaal)

External links
NS website 
Dutch Public Transport journey planner 

Railway stations in North Brabant
Railway stations opened in 1863
Railway stations on the Staatslijn F
Transport in Bergen op Zoom